Mendenhall is a British surname. Notable people with the surname include: 

 Bronco Mendenhall (born 1966), University of Virginia football coach
 Bruce Mendenhall (born 1951), American murderer and suspected serial killer
 Charles Elwood Mendenhall (1872–1935), American physicist and University of Wisconsin professor
 David Mendenhall (born 1971), American science fiction and comedy film actor
 Dorothy Reed Mendenhall (1874–1964), American physician
 George E. Mendenhall (1916–2016), American academic and educator 
 John Mendenhall (colonel) (1829–1892), American military official
 Joseph Mendenhall (1920-2013), American diplomat
 Ken Mendenhall (born 1948), former American football player
 Mat Mendenhall (born 1957), American football player
 Murray Mendenhall (1898–1972), American basketball player
 Murray Mendenhall Jr. (1925–2014), American football player
 Rashard Mendenhall (born 1987), former NFL running back
 Robert Mendenhall (born 1954), president Western Governors University 
 Thomas Corwin Mendenhall (1841–1924), American physicist and meteorologist, namesake of Alaskan place names
 Thomas C. Mendenhall (historian) (1910–1998), Yale professor, president of Smith College; authority on collegiate rowing
 Walter Curran Mendenhall (1871–1957), former director of the U.S. Geological Survey

English-language surnames